Veliki Kal is a settlement in the Municipality of Mirna Peč in southeastern Slovenia. It lies in the hills east of Mirna Peč in the historical region of Lower Carniola. The municipality is now included in the Southeast Slovenia Statistical Region.

References

External links
Veliki Kal on Geopedia

Populated places in the Municipality of Mirna Peč